Harp is a surname. Notable people with the surname include:

Clarine Harp (born 1978), American voice actress
Everette Harp (born 1961), American saxophonist
Jessica Harp (born 1982), American musician
Susana Harp (born 1968), Mexican singer
Tom Harp (born c. 1927), American football player and coach
Toni Harp (born 1949), American politician

English-language surnames